Out There (also listed as Out There with Betty Carter) is a bebop album by jazz vocalist Betty Carter with an ensemble under the direction of alto saxophonist Gigi Gryce. The arrangements were provided by Gryce, Ray Copeland, Melba Liston, Benny Golson and Tommy Bryce. The album was produced by Esmond Edwards and released 1958 on Peacock Records.  
Ron Wynn of Allmusic called the album "a dynamic set."

All the tracks from Out There were reissued on the 1992 Impulse!/GRP compilation album I Can't Help It. The album Out There as such was also reissued in 2005 in France on Blue Moon Records.

Tracks
 “You're Driving Me Crazy” (Walter Donaldson) – 1:45
 “I Can't Help It” (Betty Carter) – 2:44
 “By the Bend of the River” (Clara Edwards) – 2:07
 “Babe's Blues” (Randy Weston, Jon Hendricks) – 2:49
 “Foul Play” (Norman Mapp) – 2:21
 “You're Getting to Be a Habit with Me” (Al Dubin, Harry Warren) – 3:30
 “On the Isle of May” (Mack David, André Kostelanetz) – 2:02
 “But Beautiful” (Jimmy Van Heusen, Sonny Burke) – 3:58
 “All I've Got” (David Cole) – 2:15
 “Make It Last” (Bob Haymes, Glenn G. Paxton) – 4:30
 “Blue Bird of Happiness” (Edward Heyman, Sandor Harmati) – 1:30
 “Something Wonderful” (Richard Rodgers, Oscar Hammerstein II) – 3:35

Personnel
 Betty Carter - vocals
 Gigi Gryce - alto saxophone, arranger
 Ray Copeland - trumpet
 Kenny Dorham - trumpet (#1–6)
 Melba Liston - trombone
 Jimmy Powell - alto saxophone (#1–6)
 Benny Golson - tenor saxophone (#1–6)
 Sahib Shihab - baritone saxophone (#1–6)
 Jerome Richardson - tenor saxophone, flute, bassoon (#7–12)
 Wynton Kelly - piano
 Sam Jones - double bass (#1, 3–6)
 Peck Morrison - double bass (# 2, 7–12)
 Specs Wright - drums

References

External links
 

1958 albums
Albums arranged by Gigi Gryce
Albums produced by Esmond Edwards
Avant-garde jazz albums
Bebop albums
Betty Carter albums
Peacock Records albums